Julien Lefèvre (1 July 1907 – 4 January 1984) was a Luxembourgian sculptor. His work was part of the sculpture event in the art competition at the 1936 Summer Olympics.

References

1907 births
1984 deaths
20th-century Luxembourgian sculptors
20th-century male artists
Luxembourgian sculptors
Olympic competitors in art competitions
People from Esch-sur-Alzette